Robert Peter Bauer (born 11 November 1962) is a Dutch lieutenant admiral in the Royal Netherlands Navy, currently serving as the Chair of the NATO Military Committee since June 2021. He previously served as Chief of Defence (Dutch: Commandant der Strijdkrachten) from October 2017 to April 2021, and as the Vice Chief of Defence of the Armed forces of the Netherlands from 1 September 2015 to 13 July 2017.

Naval career
Bauer entered the Royal Netherlands Navy through the Royal Naval College in 1981 until commissioned as a naval commander in 1984. He also completed the Advanced Strategic
and General Studies Programme in 1998.

Bauer commanded the HNLMS De Ruyter, a De Zeven Provinciën-class air defence and command frigate in 2005 to 2007. His command also includes the operational deployment in the Mediterranean with the Standing NATO Maritime Group 2 as part of the NATO Response Force (Operation Active Endeavour). He was deployed in Bahrain in 2006 as the Deputy Commander of Task Force 150 in the Operation Enduring Freedom. He also commanded the HNLMS Johan de Witt, a Landing Platform Dock (LPD) amphibious warfare ship, in 2010 to 2011.

Bauer was promoted to commodore in 2011 and appointed as Deputy Director of Plans for Operational Policy and Innovation, focusing on the future defense fields of The Netherlands. In 2012, he was promoted to rear admiral and appointed as Director of Plans. He was also a member of the Council for Defence Research and Development, the National Council for Cyber Security and the Netherlands Coast Guard Council. He also served as the Chairman of the Defence Business Platform and also became a board member of the National Committee for 4 and 5 May.

Bauer was appointed Vice Chief of Defence, and promoted to vice admiral, on 22 September 2015. In July 2017, he handed his position as the Vice Chief of Defence to Lieutenant General Martin Wijnen, in order to prepare for his post as Chief of Defence. He became the Chief of Defence on 5 October 2017, after the resignation of Tom Middendorp and then-Minister of Defence Jeanine Hennis-Plasschaert in the aftermath of the death of two Dutch soldiers in a training accident in Mali. He was promoted to lieutenant admiral – the highest rank in the Royal Netherlands Navy, equivalent to a NATO OF-9 flag officer (i.e., four stars) – on October 5, 2017.

On 9 October 2020, Bauer was elected by various Allied Chiefs of Defence from the NATO Military Committee as the new Chairman of the NATO Military Committee, the senior military adviser to the Secretary General of NATO. He took up the position replacing Air Chief Marshal Sir Stuart Peach, on 25 June 2021.

Awards and Badges

  Commander, Order of Orange-Nassau
  Officer's Cross (Operation Enduring Freedom)
  Royal Netherlands Navy service medal
  NATO Medal (Operation Active Endeavour, Article 5)
  Commander, Order of Merit of the Grand Duchy of Luxembourg
  Officier, Legion of Honour 
  Grand Officer, Order of the Crown
  Grand Cross, Order for Merits to Lithuania (Variant: Public Service and Cross-Border Relations)
  Commemorative Medal for Peace Operations
  Golden Sun of the Higher Defence Command Formation
 Maritime Air Controller Skill Badge

Personal life
Bauer comes from a family of engineers. He is married to Maaike Bauer and they have three children.

References

External links
 @CMC_NATO at Twitter
 Chief of Defence 

1962 births
Living people
Chiefs of Defence (Netherlands)
Royal Netherlands Naval College alumni
Royal Netherlands Navy admirals
Royal Netherlands Navy officers
Dutch military personnel of the War in Afghanistan (2001–2021)
Military personnel from Amsterdam